William Hirons (15 June 1871 – 5 January 1958) was a British tug of war competitor who competed in the 1908 Summer Olympics. He was part of the British team that won the gold medal in the tug of war competition.

References

External links
profile

1871 births
1958 deaths
Tug of war competitors at the 1908 Summer Olympics
Olympic tug of war competitors of Great Britain
Olympic gold medallists for Great Britain
Olympic medalists in tug of war
Medalists at the 1908 Summer Olympics
City of London Police officers
20th-century British people